Moreshet (lit. Heritage) is a community settlement in northern Israel whose members adhere to a religious Jewish identity. Located in the Lower Galilee between Karmiel and Shefa-'Amr, it falls under the jurisdiction of Misgav Regional Council.

History
The village was established in 1996 by the Amana movement.

References

External links
Home page
Moreshet Misgav Regional Council

Community settlements
Religious Israeli communities
Populated places established in 1996
Populated places in Northern District (Israel)
1996 establishments in Israel